Diego Schwartzman was the defending champion, but lost in the semifinals to Marin Čilić.

Čilić went on to win the title, defeating Milos Raonic in the final, 7–6(7–3), 6–3.

Seeds
The top four seeds receive a bye into the second round.

Draw

Finals

Top half

Bottom half

Qualifying

Seeds

Qualifiers

Lucky loser

Qualifying draw

First qualifier

Second qualifier

Third qualifier

Fourth qualifier

References
 Main Draw
 Qualifying Draw

2017 ATP World Tour
2017 in Istanbul
2017 Singles
2017 in Turkish tennis